Ger is a village in the province of Girona and autonomous community of Catalonia, Spain.

See also 
 Virgin from Ger, conserved at the  National Art Museum of Catalonia

References

External links
 Government data pages 

Populated places in the Province of Girona
Municipalities in Cerdanya (comarca)
Municipalities in the Province of Girona